Luca Boscoscuro (born 27 December 1971 in Schio) is an Italian former road racer at Grand Prix level. He was the 1995 250 cc European Champion. His best year in the world championships was in 1996, when he finished in tenth place in the 250cc class and won the IRTA CUP (World Championship for Private Team). After a career as a professional rider, remains within the racing community and, in 2002 he became Gilera and Derbi Sport Director and from 2006 to 2009 Gilera team manager, where in 2008 he won the title of 250cc with Marco Simoncelli.

Since 2010, the new project was with newly founded Speed Up team. 2010 also marked a radical rule change with the transition from two-stroke 250cc to four-stroke 600cc. He debuted in the World Championship of the newborn Moto2 class with the bike Speed Up S10 with which he won six pole positions, three races, and went to the podium nine times. His team was the only one that placed both riders on the podium at the same race.
In 2011 after an agreement with another frame supplier he only went to the podium twice throughout the season.
In 2012 Boscoscuro join forces with Eros Braconi founding the Speed Up Factory: the new S12 chassis is entirely made in Italy, from design to manufacturing.

In 2013 continues the evolution of the prototype and three are the teams NGM Mobile Forward Racing, QMMF Racing Team and Arginano y Gines Racing Team, that choose the product of the Italian Factory, eight riders will participate with a SF13 to the World Championship Moto2 category.

Career statistics

Grand Prix motorcycle racing

Races by year
(key) (Races in bold indicate pole position; races in italics indicate fastest lap)

References 

1971 births
People from Schio
Italian motorcycle racers
250cc World Championship riders
Living people
Sportspeople from the Province of Vicenza